Obaidullah Khan Azmi is an Indian Sunni Islamic politician from Indian National Congress. He was a member of Rajya Sabha, the upper house of the Indian Parliament from 1990 to 2008. He represented Uttar Pradesh during 1990-96 and from Jharkhand during 1996–2002 from Janata Dal party. During 1992–96 he was General Secretary of Janata Dal and later became its Senior Vice-President. From 2002 to 2008 he represented Madhya Pradesh from Indian National Congress party.

Shah Bano case protest
Obaidullah Khan Azmi became popular by his public speeches against Supreme Court Judgment in Shah Bano case. The audio cassettes of his speech were widely circulated and sold. He, at the time, had become a most sought after speaker for anti-Shah Bano case meetings in Mumbai. Mumbai police filed case against the Maulana and expelled him from Mumbai declaring his speeches inflammatory.

See also
 Asaduddin Owaisi
 Tauqeer Raza Khan

External links
 Profile on Rajya Sabha website

References

Indian National Congress politicians from Uttar Pradesh
Rajya Sabha members from Madhya Pradesh
Living people
1949 births
Politicians from Azamgarh district
Rajya Sabha members from Uttar Pradesh
Rajya Sabha members from Jharkhand
Janata Dal politicians
Samajwadi Party politicians
Nationalist Congress Party politicians from Uttar Pradesh
Uttar Pradesh politicians